Schweinitz is a village in Saxony-Anhalt, Germany.

Schweinitz may also refer to:

Trhové Sviny in the Czech Republic, known in German as Schweinitz
Schweinitz (river), river of Saxony, Germany

People with the surname
Edmund Alexander de Schweinitz (1825–1887), American bishop of the Moravian Church
Emil Alexander de Schweinitz (1866–1904), American bacteriologist
Lewis David de Schweinitz (1780–1834), American botanist
Wolfgang von Schweinitz (born 1953), German composer

German-language surnames